Rosalind Fox Solomon (born 1930) is an American photographer based in New York City.

Life and education
Solomon was born on 2 April 1930 in Highland Park, Illinois. She graduated from Highland Park High School in 1947. She attended Goucher College in Baltimore, Maryland graduating with a Bachelor of Arts in Political Science in 1951.

She married Joel W. (Jay) Solomon (1921–1984), with whom she had two children. The marriage ended in divorce.

Solomon sailed to Belgium and France with The Experiment in International Living.

She studied intermittently with Lisette Model from 1971 to 1977.

Before photography
Later Solomon became the Southern Regional Director of the Experiment in International Living. In this capacity, she visited communities throughout the Southern United States, recruiting families to host international guests and interact with other cultures in a personal way.

In August 1963, Solomon traveled to Washington, D.C. for an interview with the Equal Employment Department of the United States Agency for International Development (USAID), which was then establishing a program for part-time recruiter–consultants in various regions of the United States. Solomon and a group of USAID staff including Roger Wilkins (nephew of Roy Wilkins) joined the March on Washington for Jobs and Freedom, during which Martin Luther King Jr. delivered his famous "I Have a Dream" speech.  Subsequently, in her work for USAID, Solomon traveled to historically black colleges in Alabama, Georgia, Mississippi, and Tennessee where she spoke to students and faculty about overseas employment opportunities.

Photography
In 1968 Solomon's volunteer work with the Experiment in International Living brought her to Japan where she stayed with a family near Tokyo. There, at age 38, Solomon began to use an Instamatic camera to communicate her feelings and thoughts. This was the starting point for her photography practice, which also includes prose related to her life experiences.

Upon her return to the United States, Solomon photographed regularly. She purchased a Nikkormat in 1969 and in the garden shed she processed 35 mm black and white film and printed her first pictures. In 1971, she began intermittent studies with Lisette Model during visits to New York City. By 1974 she was using a medium format camera. Dolls, children, and manikins were some of her first subjects, along with portraits and rituals. She works with black and white film exclusively.

In 1975, Solomon began photographing at the Baroness Erlanger Hospital in Chattanooga, Tennessee. She photographed people recovering from operations, wounds, and illness.

In early 1977, Solomon photographed William Eggleston, his family and friends in Tennessee and Mississippi. She moved to Washington where she photographed artists and politicians for the series "Outside the White House" in 1977 and 1978.

In 1978 and 1979, she also photographed in the Guatemalan Highlands. Her interest in how people cope with adversity, led her to witness a shaman's rites and a funeral and made photographs in Easter processions.

In 1980, Solomon began her work in Ancash, Peru where she returned intermittently for over 20 years. She made photographs in cemeteries where damage from the 1970 Ancash earthquake was still apparent. She continued photographing shamans, cemeteries, funerals and other rituals. She also photographed people of a subsistence economy surviving the extremes of life through Catholic, Evangelist, and Indigenous rites.

With a fellowship from the American Institute of Indian Studies, in 1981 Solomon began photographing festival rites in India. She found an expression of female energy and power in the forms of the goddess figures created in the sculptors' communities of Kolkata (Calcutta). In 1982 and 1983, she continued this work. While there, she photographed artists, including the painter, Ganesh Pyne and the filmmaker, Satyagit Ray. She also made portraits of the Dalai Lama and photographed Prime Minister Indira Gandhi.

In 1987 and 1988, Solomon photographed people with AIDS alone, with their families, and with their lovers. The project resulted in the exhibition, Portraits in the Time of AIDS at the Grey Gallery of Art of New York University in 1988.

In 1988, with concerns about the rise of ethnic violence in the world, she made her first trip to Poland. In 2003, she returned to work again in Poland. In 1988 Solomon's interest in race relations and ethnic violence, took her to Northern Ireland, Zimbabwe and South Africa. She continued the project in 1989 and 1990 in Northern Ireland and South Africa. In the 1990s, she visited hospitals in Yugoslavia and rehabilitation centers for victims of mines in Cambodia, and photographed victims of the American/Vietnam War near Hanoi.

Solomon photographed in Israel and the West Bank for five months during 2010 and 2011, part of This Place. She made portraits of people in Israel and the West Bank.  She was photographing Palestinians in Jenin, and happened to be only a few minutes away when Israeli–Palestinian actor and director of The Freedom Theatre, Juliano Mer-Khamis, was gunned down in April 2011.

Publications

Books, catalogues, etc of Solomon's photography

 Union Depot: Photographed 1971–1973. Rosalind Solomon, 1973. Portfolio of 22 photographs. Edition of 100. 
 Rosalind Solomon, Washington: May 15 – June 29, 1980. Washington, DC: Corcoran Gallery, 1980. Twenty-page exhibition catalogue, text by Jane Livingston. 
 Rosalind Solomon: Venezia, 13. VII – 14. VIII. 1982. Venice: Ikona Photo Gallery, 1982. Eighteen-page exhibition catalogue, ed. Živa Kraus, text by Ljerka Mifka.  
 Rosalind Solomon: India: An exhibition of photographs. New Delhi: M. Pistor for the United States Information Service, 1983. Sixteen-page exhibition catalogue, text by Will Stapp. 
 Rosalind Solomon. Earth Rites: Photographs from inside the Third World. San Diego, CA: Museum of Photographic Arts, 1986. Twelve-page exhibition catalogue, text by Arthur Ollman.  
 Rosalind Solomon. Portraits in the Time of AIDS. New York: Grey Art Gallery & Studio Center, New York University, 1988. . Exhibition catalogue, text by Thomas Sokolowski.
 Rosalind Solomon: Photographs, 1976–1987. Tucson, Arizona: Etherton Gallery, 1988. Thirty-two-page exhibition catalogue. With an essay by Arthur Ollman. 
 Rosalind Solomon: El Perú y Otros Lugares = Peru and Other Places. Lima: Museo de Arte de Lima, 1996. Exhibition catalogue.
 Rosalind Solomon. Chapalingas. Göttingen: Steidl, 2003. . Text in German, English and French. Published to accompany an exhibition a Die Photographische Sammlung/SK Stiftung Kultur, Cologne.
 Rosalind Solomon. Polish Shadow. Göttingen: Steidl, 2006. .
 Rosalind Fox Solomon. Them. London: Mack, 2014. .
 Rosalind Fox Solomon. Got to Go. London: Mack, 2016. .
 Rosalind Fox Solomon. Liberty Theater. London: Mack, 2018. . With an essay, "The Play of Freedoms", by Stanley Wolukau-Wanambwa.
 Rosalind Fox Solomon. The Forgotten. London: Mack, 2021. .

Recordings by Solomon
Corazón: Songs and Music Recorded in Peru by Rosalind Solomon. Folkways Records FSS 34035, 1985. Recorded, produced and with photographs by Solomon. Reissued by Smithsonian Folkways. 
Indian Love Rites: Durga Puja and Kali Puja in Calcutta. Ethnic Folkways Records FE 4349, 1986. Recording produced by Solomon, and with photographs by her. The sounds of Durga Puja and Kali Puja. Reissued by Smithsonian Folkways.

Other publications
 John Szarkowski. Mirrors and Windows: American Photography Since 1960. Catalog of exhibition held at the Museum of Modern Art, 1978, and elsewhere, 1978–1980. , .
 Susan Kismaric. American Children: Photographs from the Collection of the Museum of Modern Art. New York: Museum of Modern Art, 1980. , .
 Keith F Davis, ed. Wanderlust: Work by eight contemporary photographers from the Hallmark photographic collection. Kansas City, MO: Hallmark Cards. Distribution: Albuquerque, New Mexico: University of New Mexico Press, 1987. .
 Susan Kismaric. American Politicians: Photographs from 1843 to 1993. New York: Museum of Modern Art, 1994.
 Vincent Gerard and Cedric Laty. Eggleston on Film. 85 minutes. 2005
 Amerika: die soziale Landschaft 1940 bis 2006: Meisterwerke amerikanischer Fotografie  America: The social landscape from 1940 until 2006: Masterpieces of American photography. Bologna, Italy: Damiani; Vienna: Kunsthalle Wien, 2006. . Catalogue of an exhibition held at Kunsthalle Wien.
 Charlotte Cotton, ed. This Place. London: Mack, 2014. . Photographs of Israel and the West Bank by Frédéric Brenner, Wendy Ewald, Martin Kollar, Josef Koudelka, Jungjin Lee, Gilles Peress, Fazal Sheikh, Stephen Shore, Solomon, Thomas Struth, Jeff Wall and Nick Waplington.
Gabriele Conrath-Scholl and Stephan Berg, eds. Mit anderen Augen. Das Porträt in der zeitgenössischen Fotografie = With Different Eyes: The Portrait in Contemporary Photography. Cologne: Snoeck, 2016. . Catalogue of the 2016 exhibition.

Exhibitions

Solo exhibitions

Group exhibitions

Major collections

In 2007, the University of Arizona's Center for Creative Photography acquired Solomon's archive, which includes her photographic archive, books and video work.

Awards
1979: Guggenheim Fellowship
1989: National Endowment for the Arts fellowship
1980s: Grants from the American Institute of Indian Studies
2011: Honorary degree from Goucher College
2016: Lucie Award in Achievement in Portraiture category
2019: International Center of Photography Infinity Award: Lifetime Achievement

Notes

References

External links

1930 births
Living people
Photographers from Illinois
National Endowment for the Arts Fellows
People from Highland Park, Illinois
Goucher College alumni
20th-century American photographers
21st-century American photographers
20th-century American women photographers
21st-century American women photographers